XHPI-FM is a radio station on 93.1 FM in Guadalajara. The station is owned by Grupo ACIR and carries its Amor romantic music format.

History
XHPI received its first concession on November 10, 1982. The original concessionaire was Grupo ACIR founder Francisco Ibarra López.

References

Radio stations in Guadalajara
Radio stations established in 1982
1982 establishments in Mexico
Grupo ACIR